This is a list of indigenous Australian (Aboriginal and Torres Strait Islander) athletes and sportspeople. Sports is one of the areas of mainstream Australian society in which Indigenous Australians have been able to break through in some degree.

American football 

 Jesse Williams (American football)

Association football (Soccer) 

Fred Agius
Gordon Briscoe
James Brown
Jacob Collard
Travis Dodd
Shadeene Evans
Frank Farina
Jada Mathyssen-Whyman
Tahj Minniecon
John Moriarty
 Jade North - first Indigenous association footballer to captain Socceroos and captain national league championship
Tanya Oxtoby
Charles Perkins
Tate Russell
Adam Sarota
Gema Simon
Kyah Simon
Lorenzo Sipi
Bridgette Starr
Allira Toby
Kasey Wehrman
David Williams
 Gianni Stensness
 Harry Kewell
Harry Williams
Lydia Williams

Athletics (track and field) 

 Lynch Cooper
Robert Crowther
Cathy Freeman
 Benn Harradine
 Percy Hobson
 Patrick Johnson
Bobby Kinnear
 Nova Peris-Kneebone
 Josh Ross
 Kyle Vander Kuyp

Australian rules football 

 Chance Bateman
 Harley Bennell
 Eddie Betts
 Shai Bolton
 Peter Burgoyne
 Shaun Burgoyne
 Barry Cable
Charlie Cameron
 Troy Cook
 Leon Davis
Alwyn Davey
Aaron Davey
Courtenay Dempsey
 Shane Edwards
 Graham "Polly" Farmer
 Jeff Farmer
 Lance Franklin
 Jeff Garlett
 Adam Goodes
 Brett Goodes
 Antoni Grover
 Jarrod Harbrow
 Des Headland
Bradley Hill
Josh Hill
Stephen Hill
 Eddie Hocking
 Syd Jackson
 Lewis Jetta
 Leroy Jetta
 Neville Jetta
 Graham Johncock
 Chris Johnson
Joe Johnson (First ever Indigenous Australian to play in the VFL/AFL)
 Michael Johnson
 Liam Jones
 Dale Kickett
 Derek Kickett
Andrew Krakouer
 Jim and Phil Krakouer
Nathan Krakouer
 Chris Lewis
Ben Long
 Michael Long
Nathan Lovett-Murray
 Brandon Matera
 Peter Matera
Phillip Matera
Steven May
 Norm McDonald
Anthony McDonald-Tipungwuti
 Ashley McGrath
 Michael McLean
 Andrew McLeod
 Stephen Michael
Steven Motlop
 Justin Murphy
 Sir Douglas Nicholls - Australian rules footballer and Governor of South Australia
 Michael O'Loughlin
 Danyle Pearce
 Jared Petrenko
 Byron Pickett
 Kysaiah Pickett
 Marlion Pickett
 Cyril Rioli
 Daniel Rioli
Dean Rioli
 Maurice Rioli
 Maurice Rioli Jr
Willie Rioli
 Patrick Ryder
 Matthew Stokes
 Richard Tambling
 Lindsay Thomas
 Travis Varcoe
Andrew Walker
Michael Walters
 Gavin Wanganeen
 Daniel Wells
 Darryl White
 Mark Williams
Zac Williams
Chad Wingard
 Nicky Winmar
 Michael Walters
 David Wirrpanda

Basketball 

 Rohanee Cox
 Nathan Jawai, first Indigenous Australian to play in the NBA
 Patty Mills
 Danny Morseu

Boxing 

 Anthony Mundine, holds WBC Silver Super Welterweight title, & former Interim WBA Light Middleweight Champion, 2 time WBA Super Middleweight Champion, IBO Middleweight Champion.
 Daniel Geale, former IBF, IBO and WBA Super Middleweight Champion.
 Lionel Rose, held WBC & WBA World bantamweight titles. The first Koori "Indigenous Australian" to win a World title.	
 Robbie Peden, former IBF Super Featherweight Champion.
 Dave Sands, held the Australian middleweight, light heavyweight and heavyweight titles and won the Commonwealth middleweight title, world boxing hall of famer.
 Wally Carr, held the Australasian Light Middleweight title, Australian Junior Middleweight, Middleweight, Super Middleweight, Light Heavyweight Title, Commonwealth Middleweight title and Oriental Middleweight title.
 Tony Mundine, held the Australian middleweight, light heavyweight, cruiserweight and heavyweight titles, Commonwealth middleweight and light heavyweight titles.
 Ron Richards, held the Australian heavyweight, middleweight, light heavyweight title, Commonwealth middleweight title.
 Jerry Jerome, first Indigenous Australian to win a major boxing title, Australian Middleweight Champion.
 Joe Williams	
 Neville "Chappy" Williams
 Elley Bennett
 Hector Thompson
 Frank Roberts, Australia's first Indigenous Olympic boxer.
 Lawrence Austin
 Damien Hooper
 Cameron Hammond
 Eugene Eades 
 Austin Eades 
 Renold Quinlan
 Paul Fleming
 Keith Saunders
 Bradley Hore

Cricket 

 Scott Boland, only the second male Indigenous Australian as of 2021 to play Test Cricket for Australia.
 Dan Christian
Ashleigh Gardner, first Indigenous Australian woman to play in a cricket World Cup.
 Eddie Gilbert, 1930s Queensland cricketer
 Jason Gillespie, first male indigenous Australian to play cricket for Australia, and until Scott Boland's debut in 2021, the only one to play Test Cricket for Australia.
 Jack Marsh
 John McGuire, captain of an Aboriginal XI that toured England in 1988
 Johnny Mullagh, 1860s cricketer, who was a member of the Aboriginal cricket team that toured England in 1868
 Edna Newfong (Crouch) and Mabel Crouch (Campbell), were members of the Queensland XI women's cricket team that played England in 1934-35.  They were the first indigenous women to represent Australia in any sport.
D'Arcy Short
 Faith Thomas, first female Indigenous Australian in the Australian Women's Cricket Team and thus the first Indigenous Australian woman to play Test cricket.

Darts 
 Kyle Anderson
 Beau Anderson

Field hockey 

 Des Abbott
 Joel Carroll
 Baeden Choppy
Lorelle Morrissey
 Nova Peris-Kneebone
 Brooke Peris

Horse racing 
 Darby McCarthy, jockey
 Frank Reys, jockey
 Lester Fell, jockey, Indigenous histories

Motorsport 
 Jeff Leisk, Motocross 
 Craig Anderson, Motocross 
 Chad Reed, Motocross 
 Brendon Cook, car racing
 Darren McDonald, Auscar

Rugby league 

 Wayne Alberts
 Matthew Allwood
 Tyson Andrews
 Preston Campbell
 Sam Backo
 Ben Barba
 Michael Bani
 Kurt Baptiste
 Lenny Beckett
 Roy Bell
 Arthur Beetson, First Indigenous Australian to captain Australia in any sport (1973)
 Sam Bowie
 Matt Bowen
 Brenton Bowen
 Nathan Blacklock (also rugby union)
 Maurice Blair
 Greg Bird
 Fred Briggs
 Justin Brooker
 Caleb Binge
 Jason Bulgarelli
 Burnum Burnum
 Justin Carney
 Will Chambers (also rugby union)
 Beau Champion
 Selwyn Cobbo
 Mal Cochrane
 Larry Corowa
 Owen Craigie
 Tony Currie
 Laurie Daley
 Paul Davis
 Nakia Davis-Welsh
 Sid Domic
 Justin Doyle
 Leo Dynevor
 Jason Edwards
 Steve Ella
 Dylan Farrell
 Andrew Fifita
 David Fifita
 Blake Ferguson
 John Ferguson
 Frank Fisher
 Jake Friend
 Jake Foster
 Dane Gagai
 Craig Garvey
 George Green
 Isaac Gordon
 Yillenn Gordon
 Ron Gibbs
 Brett Grogan
 Chris Grevsmuhl
 Jeff Hardy
 Tony Hearn
 Shannon Hegarty
 Justin Hodges
 Jayden Hodges
 Josh Hoffman
 Neil Henry
 Kyle Turner
 Greg Inglis, Most tries scored in State of Origin
 Jamal Idris
 Willie Isa
 Ryan James
 Alex Johnston
 Ben Jones
 Rod Jensen
 Johnny Jarrett
 Albert Kelly
 Luke Kelly
 Robert Lui
 Gavin Lester
 Cliff Lyons
 Daine Laurie
 Ian Lacey
 Royston Lightning
 Kevin Longbottom
 Tom Learoyd-Lahrs
 Robert Laurie
 Edrick Lee
 Brenko Lee
 Michael Lett
 George Longbottom
 Kevin Longbottom
 Cliff Lyons
 Graham Lyons
 Lionel Morgan
 Anthony Mundine (also boxing)
 Wally McArthur
 Nathan Merritt
 Kevin McGuinness
 PJ Marsh
 Anthony Mitchell
 Joel Moon
 Donald Malone
 Ewan McGrady
 Chris McKenna
 Caitlin Moran
 Denis Moran
 Keiran Moseley
 Shea Moylan
 Dane Nielsen
 Ken Nagas
 Lavina O'Mealey
 Wes Patten
 Danny Peacock
 Nathan Peats
 David Peachey
 Tyrone Peachey
 Corey Paterson
 Scott Prince
 Steve Renouf
 Amos Roberts
 James Roberts
 Tyrone Roberts
 George Rose
 Joel Romelo
 Reece Robinson
 Travis Robinson
 Will Robinson
 Ian Russell
 Chris Sandow
 Wendell Sailor (also rugby union)
 Matt Sing
 Eric Simms
 Ron Saddler
 Jamie Simpson
 Dale Shearer
 Jamie Soward
 Aiden Sezer
 Craig Salvatori
 Colin Scott
 John Simon
 Taleena Simon
 Will Smith
 Bruce Stewart
 Corey Stewart
 Johnathan Thurston
 Joel Thompson
 Ray Thompson
 Gorden Tallis
 Timana Tahu (also rugby union)
 Brad Tighe
 Sam Thaiday
 Milton Thaiday (also rugby union)
 Willie Tonga
 Esi Tonga
 Craig Trindall
 Darrell Trindall
 Albert Torrens
 Travis Waddell
 Daniel Wagon
 Ricky Walford
 Andrew Walker (also rugby union)
 Shannon Walker (also rugby union)
 Luke Walsh
 Palmer Wapau
 Derrick Watkins
 Carl Webb
 Brent Webb
 Rhys Wesser
 Dean Widders
 Jack Wighton
 Ty Williams
 Joe Williams (also boxing)
 Richard Williams
 Jonathan Wright
 Jharal Yow Yeh
 Kevin Yow Yeh

Rugby union 

 Kurtley Beale
 Nathan Blacklock
 Shannon Walker
 Burnum Burnum
 Matt Hodgson
 Gary Ella
 Glen Ella
 Mark Ella
 Anthony Fainga'a
 Saia Fainga'a
 Colby Fainga'a
 Frank Ivory
 Cecil Ramalli, Now acknowledged as the first Indigenous Wallaby in 1938 according to the ARU.
 Milton Thaiday
 Andrew Walker
 Jim Williams
 Will Chambers
 Lloyd McDermott, First Indigenous player to represent Australia.
 Timana Tahu
 Rory Arnold
 Richie Arnold
 Andy Muirhead
 Harrison Goddard
 John Porch
 Will Chambers
 Moses Sorovi

Rugby Sevens 
 Shannon Walker
 Bo de la Cruz
 Maurice Longbottom
 John Porch
 Tanisha Staton
 Mahalia Murphy
 Taleena Simon

Swimming 
 Ben Austin
 Samantha Riley

Tennis 

 Evonne Goolagong, Won 7 Grand Slam Singles titles. They were all in the open era.
 Ashleigh Barty

See also
 Indigenous Australian Olympians
 Indigenous Australian Paralympians

References 

Indigenous Australians
 
Sportspeople